The ninth edition of the Johan Cruyff Shield was held on 8 August 2004 between 2003–04 Eredivisie champions Ajax and 2003–04 KNVB Cup winners FC Utrecht. FC Utrecht won the match 4–2.

Match details

2004
Johan Cruijff-schaal
j
j
Johan Cruyff Shield